is a passenger railway station located in the city of Saijō, Ehime Prefecture, Japan. It is operated by JR Shikoku and has the station number "Y31". It is the main station of the city of Saijō and a major terminal on the Yosan Line with many train services beginning or ending here.

Lines
Iyo-Saijō Station is served by the JR Shikoku Yosan Line and is located 114.3 km from the beginning of the line at Takamatsu. It is the western terminal for Yosan line local trains which ply the  - Iyo-Saijō sector. Passengers on local services continuing eastwards or westwards have to change trains. The Rapid Sunport, and Nanpū Relay which provide a through service to  start and end here.

In addition, the following JR Shikoku limited express services also serve the station:
Morning Express Takamatsu - in one direction only, starts here for 

Layout
The station consists of an island platform and a side platform serving three tracks. The station building houses a waiting room, shops, a JR Midori no Madoguchi ticket window and a JR Travel Centre (Warp Plaza). Car parking and rental are available.  The island platform is reached by means of a bridge equipped with elevators for barrier-free access.

Numerous sidings and passing loops branch off on both sides of the station with some of them serving the Shikoku Railway Cultural Center, which has facilities both north and south of the station.

Adjacent stations

History
At that time the station was operated by Japanese Government Railways, later becoming Japanese National Railways (JNR). With the privatization of JNR on 1 April 1987, control of the station passed to JR Shikoku.

On 25 September 2017, JR Shikoku completed a barrier-free upgrade project for the station. The existing footbridge linking the platforms was replaced by a new bridge equipped with elevators.

Surrounding area
The Railway History Park in Saijō, a complex of three attractions next to the station: 
Shikoku Railway Cultural Center - a railway museum with wings to the north and south of the station and features among other exhibits,  a 0 Series Shinkansen and a JNR Class DF50 in working condition and kept on a siding for demonstration runs.
Shinji Sogō Memorial Museum - dedicated to the fourth president of JNR and credited with the creation of the Tōkaidō Shinkansen. He was also a mayor of Saijō City. 
Saijō Tourist Information Center

See also
 List of railway stations in Japan

References

External links

Iyo-Saijō Station (JR Shikoku)

Railway stations in Ehime Prefecture
Railway stations in Japan opened in 1921
Saijō, Ehime